Dyukov may refer to:

 7318 Dyukov (1969 OX), Main Belt asteroid

People
 Alexander Dyukov (historian) (born 1978), Russian historian and journalist
 Alexander Valeryevich Dyukov (born 1967), businessman and president of the Russian Football Union

See also
 Dyakov (disambiguation)
 Dyukovo, a village in Spasskoye Rural Settlement, Vologda Oblast, Russia